34 Field Regiment (Cassino II) is part of the Regiment of Artillery of the Indian Army.

History

Formation

The Regiment was raised as the 8th Battalion of the Fifth Maratha Light Infantry at Belgaum on February 1, 1941 under Lt Col LCM Bellamy, MC. During World War II, the regiment participated in a number of battles as 4 Maratha Anti Tank Regiment initially in Iraq and Egypt. It played a decisive role in the Italian Campaign against the Germans in Battle of Cassino in the 'Lir Valley Operation' theatre from 11-13 May 1944 which earned them the coveted Honour title of “Cassino-II” and one DSO, Two Military Cross and many other Gallantry medals.

Operations

Some of the major operations undertaken by the Regiment include:

World War II The Regiment served in Iraq, Palestine, Egypt and Italy between 1942 and 1945. In Italy,  the Regiment being a part of 8th Indian Division, during the 'Liri Valley Operations' carried their guns across the River Gari through ropeways and provided accurate and timely fire power which proved crucial in the Battle of Monte Cassino in 1944 and the Regiment was thereafter conferred with the Battle Honour  of  "Cassino-II".

Hyderabad Police Action - 1948 The Regiment which had become the first Self Propelled Indian Artillery Regiment in 1946 with the 17 Pounder Archers moved to Hyderabad in 1948 as part of 1 Armoured Division to quell an armed insurrection aimed against the formal union of this princely state with the Union of India.

Indo-Pakistani War of 1971  The Regiment (which had converted to a Medium Regiment in 1963) saw action in Uri, Tangdhar and Naushera sector of Jammu and Kashmir.

Equipment

The regiment has had the following guns in chronological order

18 Pounder Gun
17 Pounder Archer
5.5 Inch Gun
M-46 130 mm Field Gun
160 mm Heavy Mortar
155 mm Soltam
Indian Field Gun

See also
List of artillery regiments of Indian Army

References

External links
 List of 15 personnel killed in Italy

Artillery regiments of the Indian Army after 1947
Military units and formations established in 1941